What Else Do You Do? (A Compilation of Quiet Music) is a various artists compilation album, released in 1990 by Shimmy Disc.

Track listing

Personnel 
Adapted from the What Else Do You Do? (A Compilation of Quiet Music) liner notes.
 Kramer – production, engineering

Release history

References

External links 
 

1990 compilation albums
Albums produced by Kramer (musician)
Shimmy Disc compilation albums